Davidson Vincent (born 5 September 2001) is a Haitian swimmer. He competed in the 2020 Summer Olympics.

References

2001 births
Living people
Swimmers at the 2020 Summer Olympics
Haitian male swimmers
Olympic swimmers of Haiti
People from Centre (department)